Jonathan Baginski is an Australian Filmmaker and Futurist.

Biography

Jonathan Baginski (Born in Sydney, Australia) is a filmmaker and futurist, often working between virtual and physical mediums. Originally specialising in industrial design, Jonathan moved to interactive entertainment (games) wheres he worked as a visual effects artist and then proceeded to post production. He currently works as an independent filmmaker on sci-fi films in Wellington New Zealand. He also travelled to Los Angeles with popular rock band, Wolfmother.

Credits

2008
Stormrise (lead cinematics artist) - SEGA

2007
Fury (VG) - Auran, Codemasters

References

External links
 Jon Baginski Photography
 

Living people
Video game artists
Video game composers
Year of birth missing (living people)